Jean-Marie Sermier (born 5 March 1961 in Nozeroy, Jura) is a member of the National Assembly of France. He represents Jura's 3rd constituency,  and is a member of the Republicans.

He isn't seeking re-election in the 2022 French legislative election.

References

1961 births
Living people
People from Jura (department)
Union for a Popular Movement politicians
The Republicans (France) politicians
Deputies of the 12th National Assembly of the French Fifth Republic
Deputies of the 13th National Assembly of the French Fifth Republic
Deputies of the 14th National Assembly of the French Fifth Republic
Deputies of the 15th National Assembly of the French Fifth Republic